is a former Japanese football player. She played for the Japan national team.

Club career
Hayakawa played for Yomiuri Beleza.
She was selected Best Eleven in 1990 season.

National team career
On August 4, 1987, Hayakawa debuted for the Japan national team against Chinese Taipei. She played two games for Japan until 1988.

National team statistics

References

Year of birth missing (living people)
Living people
Japanese women's footballers
Japan women's international footballers
Nadeshiko League players
Nippon TV Tokyo Verdy Beleza players
Women's association football midfielders